Allegonda "Gonda" Jacoba Catharina Wulfse (1896-1979) was a Dutch artist.

Biography 
Wulfse was born on 28 September 1896 in Zwijndrecht. She studied in Paris, France at the Montparnasse Academy, and in Munich, Germany. Her teachers included Salomon Garf and Coba Ritsema. Her work was included in the 1939 exhibition and sale Onze Kunst van Heden (Our Art of Today) at the Rijksmuseum in Amsterdam.

Wulfse died on 23 November 1979 in Amsterdam.

References

External links
images of Wulfse's work on Invaluable

1896 births
1979 deaths
People from Zwijndrecht, Netherlands
20th-century Dutch women artists